Orlando Maldonado (born May 21, 1959 in Bayamón, Puerto Rico) is a Puerto Rican former professional boxer who competed from 1977 to 1984, challenging for the WBC super flyweight title in 1983. As an amateur, he won the bronze medal in the men's light flyweight (– 48 kg) division at the 1976 Summer Olympics. It was the second medal ever for Puerto Rico, after boxer Juan Evangelista Venegas captured the Bronze medal in 1948.

Amateur career
Maldonado was the 1977 National Golden Gloves Flyweight champion, while boxing out of Miami, Florida.

Olympic Results
Defeated Lucky Mutale (Zambia) walk-over
Defeated Brendan Dunne (Ireland) KO 1
Defeated Héctor Patri (Argentina) 5-0
Lost to Jorge Hernández (Cuba) 0-5

Professional career
Maldonado turned professional in 1977 and in 1983 challenged Rafael Orono for the WBC super flyweight title but lost via TKO. Maldonado also lost once to International Boxing Hall of Fame member Miguel Canto and to Ramon Nery. Maldonado retired in 1984 with a record of 26-5-2 with 13 KO's.

References

External links
 

1959 births
Living people
Flyweight boxers
Boxers at the 1976 Summer Olympics
Olympic boxers of Puerto Rico
Olympic bronze medalists for Puerto Rico
Sportspeople from Bayamón, Puerto Rico
Olympic medalists in boxing
Puerto Rican male boxers
Medalists at the 1976 Summer Olympics
20th-century Puerto Rican people